Sarah Cornell may refer to:

 Sarah Maria Cornell (1803–1832), American mill worker found hanged
 Sarah Cornell (actress), Canadian actress